Giovanni Gasparini (born February 20, 1908 in Palosco) was an Italian professional football player.

Honours
 Serie A champion: 1929/30.

1908 births
Year of death missing
Italian footballers
Serie A players
Atalanta B.C. players
Hellas Verona F.C. players
Inter Milan players
Brescia Calcio players
Association football midfielders